Kumanoa virgatodecaisneana is a species of alga belonging to the family Batrachospermaceae.

Synonym:
 Batrachospermum virgatodecaisneanum Sirodot (= basionym)

References

Batrachospermales